Home Vision was a Belgian brand used by the company VDI for the distribution of Atari 2600 video games created by the Taiwan-based company Gem International Corporation. Several games with the Home Vision brand were released later by other companies like ITT Family Games (from Germany) or RainbowVision (from Taiwan). VDI also manufactured its own video game system and a personal computer and released them with the Home Vision label.

Games released by Home Vision
This is a partial list of games released by Home Vision:

Go Go Home Monster
Clown Down Town
IQ-180
Lilly Adventure
Parachute
Ski Hunt
Tennis (hacked version of Tennis)
World End

External links
Home Vision entry at Atari Age

Video game publishers